Raman Subramanyan (born 23 June 1969) is an Indian table tennis player. He competed in the men's doubles event at the 2000 Summer Olympics.

References

External links
 

1969 births
Living people
Indian male table tennis players
Olympic table tennis players of India
Table tennis players at the 2000 Summer Olympics
Place of birth missing (living people)
Commonwealth Games medallists in table tennis
Commonwealth Games bronze medallists for India
Table tennis players at the 2002 Commonwealth Games
20th-century Indian people
21st-century Indian people
Medallists at the 2002 Commonwealth Games